Thomas Colin Campbell (born March 14, 1934) is an American biochemist who specializes in the effect of nutrition on long-term health. He is the Jacob Gould Schurman Professor Emeritus of Nutritional Biochemistry at Cornell University.

Campbell has become known for his advocacy of a low-fat, whole foods, plant-based diet. He claims responsibility for coining the term "Plant-Based diet" to help present his research on diet at the National Institutes of Health in 1980. He is the author of over 300 research papers and four books, The China Study (2005, co-authored with his son, Thomas M. Campbell II, which became one of America's best-selling books about nutrition), Whole (2013), The Low-Carb Fraud (2014) and The Future of Nutrition: An Insider's Look at the Science, Why We Keep Getting It Wrong, and How to Start Getting It Right (2020)  Campbell featured in the 2011 American documentary Forks Over Knives.

Campbell was one of the lead scientists of the China–Cornell–Oxford Project on diet and disease, set up in 1983 by Cornell University, the University of Oxford, and the Chinese Academy of Preventive Medicine to explore the relationship between nutrition and cancer, heart, and metabolic diseases. The study was described by The New York Times as "the Grand Prix of epidemiology".



Early life and education
Campbell grew up on a dairy farm. He studied pre-veterinary medicine at Pennsylvania State University, where he obtained his B.S. in 1956, then attended veterinary school at the University of Georgia for a year. He completed his M.S. in nutrition and biochemistry at Cornell in 1958, where he studied under Clive McCay (known for his research on nutrition and aging), and his Ph.D. in nutrition, biochemistry, and microbiology in 1961, also at Cornell.

Career
Campbell joined MIT as a research associate, then worked for 10 years in the Virginia Tech Department of Biochemistry and Nutrition, before returning to Cornell in 1975 to join its Division of Nutritional Sciences. He has worked as a senior science adviser to the American Institute for Cancer Research, and sits on the advisory board of the Physicians Committee for Responsible Medicine. He is known in particular for research, derived in part from the China study, that appears to link the consumption of animal protein with the development of cancer and heart disease. He argues that casein, a protein found in milk from mammals, is "the most significant carcinogen we consume". 

Campbell has followed a "99% vegan" diet since around 1990. He does not identify himself as a vegetarian or vegan because, he said, "they often infer something other than what I espouse". He told the New York Times: "The idea is that we should be consuming whole foods. We should not be relying on the idea that genes are determinants of our health. We should not be relying on the idea that nutrient supplementation is the way to get nutrition, because it's not. I'm talking about whole, plant-based foods."

He has been a member since 1978 of several United States National Academy of Sciences expert panels on food safety, and holds an honorary professorship at the Chinese Academy of Preventive Medicine. He is featured in the documentaries, Forks Over Knives, Planeat, Vegucated, and PlantPure Nation, a film produced by Campbell's son, Nelson Campbell. Campbell is also on the advisory board of Naked Food magazine.

Charity 
He is the founder of the T. Colin Campbell Center for Nutrition Studies, a 501(c)(3) organization, which was created to provide education about the whole food, plant based diet Campbell recommends. The Center partners with eCornell to provide an online course which is the focus of the education programs. Campbell is the president of the board of directors for the Center.

Bibliography
  Also published by Oxford University Press and People's Medical Publishing House (Beijing). First published on 1990-01-03. Professional review.
 The China Study (2005)
 Whole: Rethinking the Science of Nutrition (2013)
 Campbell, T. Colin, and Caldwell Esselstyn, Jr, MD. "Forks Over Knives: How a Plant-Based Diet Can Save America". Huffington Post, May 13, 2011.
 Campbell, T. Colin. "Nutrition: The Future of Medicine", The Huffington Post, October 25, 2010.
 Campbell, T. Colin. "Low Fat Diets Are Grossly Misrepresented". Huffington Post, September 28, 2010.
 Campbell, T. Colin, PhD, with Jacobson, Howard, PhD. (2014) The Low-Carb Fraud. BenBella Books. 
 Campbell, T. Colin, "The Future of Nutrition: An Insider's Look at the Science, Why We Keep Getting It Wrong, and How to Start Getting It Right" (2020), ASIN = B097XNM992
Campbell's h-index according to Web of Science using core collection author search for "Campbell TC*" and "Cornell University" as of February 2017 is 28 with total citation count without self-citations being 2,504.

See also 
 List of vegans

References

External links

T. Colin Campbell Center for Nutrition Studies
T. Colin Campbell interviewed on Conversations from Penn State
 

American biochemists
Cornell University faculty
Living people
1934 births
American nutritionists
Plant-based diet advocates
National Institutes of Health people
Massachusetts Institute of Technology
Virginia Tech faculty